Majura Parish is a parish of Murray County, New South Wales, a cadastral unit for use on land titles. It is located to the east of the extreme eastern tip of the ACT. The Queanbeyan-Bungendore railway line and the Kings Highway pass through the parish. About a quarter of the original nineteenth-century parish was transferred to the ACT in 1909. The land transferred was the area between the railway line in the south and the watershed of the Molonglo River in the north. This cut off part of portion 210 of Majura Parish from the rest, giving the parish a small exclave.

At the time of the transfer of land, it was located in Yarrowlumla Shire, but is now in Queanbeyan-Palerang Regional Council.

References
 Map showing proposed Federal Capital Territory and tenures of land within same, Charles Robt. Scrivener, 22 May 1909 
 
 NSW Dept. of Lands Parish map preservation project

 

Parishes of Murray County